Kothagudem Assembly constituency is a constituency of Telangana Legislative Assembly, India. It is one of constituencies in Bhadadri Kothadugem District. It includes the towns of Kothagudem and Palwancha and part of Khammam Lok Sabha constituency.

Vanama Venkateswara Rao is representing the constituency for the 4th time. He served as a minister for Vaidya Vidhana Parishad in the year 2007–09, and played a key role in formulating the 108 ambulance service and "aarogya sri" scheme. He served as DCC president for Khammam district from 1999 to 2014 and was again re-appointed in 2019 for Bhadradri Kothagudem district.

Mandals
The Assembly Constituency presently comprises the following Mandals:

Election results

Telangana Legislative Assembly election, 2018

Telangana Legislative Assembly election, 2014

Andhra Pradesh Legislative Assembly election, 2009

Members of Legislative Assembly

List of Elected Members to Kothagudem Constituency.

Trivia
 In 2018 Telangana Assembly Elections Vanama Venkatesawara Rao is the only MLA from BC community in the Congress party.
He is the only MLA in Telangana legislative assembly, who has won more times after Uttam Kumar Reddy in Congress (4 times).

See also
 List of constituencies of Telangana Legislative Assembly

References

Assembly constituencies of Telangana
Khammam district